The John F. Kilkenny United States Post Office and Courthouse, formerly the United States Post Office and Courthouse is a post office and a courthouse of the United States District Court for the District of Oregon, located in Pendleton, Oregon. Completed in 1916 under the supervision of architect Oscar Wenderoth, the building was listed on the National Register of Historic Places in 1985. In 1984, the United States Congress renamed the building for John Kilkenny, a former judge of the District of Oregon and of the United States Court of Appeals for the Ninth Circuit.

See also
National Register of Historic Places listings in Umatilla County, Oregon

References

External links
Historic Federal Courthouses page from the Federal Judicial Center

, National Register of Historic Places cover documentation

Courthouses on the National Register of Historic Places in Oregon
Significant US Post Offices in Oregon 1900-1941 TR
Government buildings completed in 1916
Buildings and structures in Pendleton, Oregon
National Register of Historic Places in Umatilla County, Oregon
1916 establishments in Oregon
Historic district contributing properties in Oregon